Robert Cole Garner (born December 15, 1984) is an American former professional baseball outfielder. He played in Major League Baseball (MLB) for the Colorado Rockies in 2011.

Career
Garner was selected by the Colorado Rockies in the 26th round (767th overall) of the 2003 Major League Baseball Draft. He made his professional debut in 2005 after injuries prevented him from doing so in 2003 or 2004. In 66 games with the Advanced Rookie Casper Rockies he hit .260 with 10 HR and 48 RBI. Garner had an outstanding 2006 with Single-A Asheville, where in 120 games, he hit .302 with 19 HR, 88 RBI and 35 SB. Garner played 2007 as a switch-hitter with A-Advanced Modesto, where in 96 games, he hit .213 with 8 HR and 33 RBI. In 2007, Garner was considered to be one of the top outfielder prospects in the Rockies organization.

Garner returned to hitting exclusively right-handed for 2008. His season ended in late July due to another injury. In 50 games, he hit .318 with 2 HR and 17 RBI. Garner played 2009 with Double-A Tulsa, where in 112 games, he hit .288 with 16 HR, 64 RBI and 13 SB. Garner played 2010 with Triple-A Colorado Springs, where in 111 games, he hit .304 with 13 HR and 61 RBI. Following the 2010 season, he was added to the Rockies' 40 man roster.

Garner spent most of the 2011 season with Colorado Springs, but had 2 stints with the Rockies. Garner made his MLB debut on July 4, 2011, pinch hitting in the 8th inning against the Atlanta Braves' Jonny Venters and flying out to right field.  The following day he was optioned back to Colorado Springs to make room for Ian Stewart, his teammate at La Quinta High School, to be recalled. He got his first hit in his second stint, a go-ahead RBI single off of Ryan Mattheus of the Washington Nationals.

On December 12, 2011, Garner was non-tendered and became a free agent. He signed a minor league contract with the New York Yankees on January 4, 2012, receiving an invitation to spring training.  Garner spent the year with the Triple-A Empire State Yankees, where in 64 games, he hit .258 with 6 HR and 25 RBI.

On January 4, 2013, Garner signed a minor league deal with the Milwaukee Brewers, and was invited to their Minor League mini-camp. Before the season, Garner was assigned to Triple-A Nashville, but was released by the Brewers on July 26. In 71 games with the Sounds, he hit .192 with 8 HR and 29 RBI.

Garner signed a minor league contract with the Toronto Blue Jays on May 26, 2015, and elected free agency on November 6.

On July 28, 2016, Garner signed with the New Britain Bees of the Atlantic League of Professional Baseball. He became a free agent after the 2016 season.

On July 7, 2017, he left the team.

On July 14, 2017, Garner was traded from the New Britain Bees to the Lancaster Barnstormers.

Personal
His grandparents from Kyushu, Japan.

References

External links

MiLB.com player profile
"Garner has overcome injuries to show potential" Rocky Mountain News
Garner's got the power to be the next Holliday Rocky Mountain News

1984 births
Living people
American baseball players of Japanese descent
American expatriate baseball players in Japan
American expatriate baseball players in Mexico
Asheville Tourists players
Broncos de Reynosa players
Casper Rockies players
Colorado Rockies players
Colorado Springs Sky Sox players
Gigantes del Cibao players
American expatriate baseball players in the Dominican Republic
Lancaster Barnstormers players
Modesto Nuts players
Major League Baseball left fielders
Major League Baseball right fielders
Mexican League baseball center fielders
Mexican League baseball right fielders
New Britain Bees players
New Hampshire Fisher Cats players
Nashville Sounds players
Scranton/Wilkes-Barre Yankees players
Southern Maryland Blue Crabs players
Tulsa Drillers players
Waikiki Beach Boys players